Zachrysia provisoria is a species of air-breathing land snail, terrestrial pulmonate gastropod mollusk in the family Camaenidae or Pleurodontidae.

Description 
The shell is medium-sized (25–30 mm width), globose in shape with 4 to 5 rapidly expanding whorls. The shell is translucent so that the speckled black mantle shows clearly through the shell of the living animal. The shell is usually thick and strong, but in acidic environments it can be thin and fragile. The body whorl is increasing in size more than those of spire. There is no umbilicus. The shell is sculptured with fairly regular, strong, curved axial ribs. Fresh specimens are with rich dark tan covering, sometimes with light brown axial streaks. Older specimens are yellowish brown. The lip and columella is white.

Individuals of Zachrysia provisoria use love darts during mating.

A very similar species of snail is Zachrysia trinitaria (Pfeiffer), from Cuba, which has recently been found in South Florida. Adults of Zachrysia trinitaria can be distinguished from Zachrysia provisoria by their large size, since they are 1.5 to 2.0 times bigger than Zachrysia provisoria.

Distribution 
The distribution of Zachrysia provisoria includes:
 Bahamas
 Barbados
 Cayman Islands
 Cuba

 Florida (Brevard, Orange, Broward, Collier, Lee, Miami-Dade, Hillsborough, Monroe, Palm Beach and Pinellas counties)
 Guadeloupe.
 Jamaica
 Nevis
 Mustique
 Puerto Rico
 Saint-Bathelemy.
 Saint-Martin/Sint Maarten.
 U.S. Virgin Islands

This species is already established in the USA, and is considered to represent a potentially serious threat as  a pest, an invasive species which could negatively affect agriculture, natural ecosystems, human health or commerce. Therefore it has been suggested that this species be given top national quarantine significance in the USA.

Habitat 
This species lives among leaf litter and among ornamental plants.

Feeding habits 
Zachrysia provisoria is a polyphagous snail attacking a wide range of agricultural and horticultural plants. Known host plants include Bougainvillea, various citrus species, crepe myrtle, mango and star fruit (carambola). The snails can rasp the bark and epiderm of cuttings of several plants.

This snail is often exported by accident from Florida to other areas and thus poses a quarantine problem for Florida.

References
This article incorporates public domain text, a public domain work of the United States Government from the reference.

External links
   Zachrysia provisoria on the UF / IFAS Featured Creatures Web site

Camaenidae
Gastropods described in 1858